Final Four to be played from 12–13 March 2016, in the Morača Sports Center in Podgorica, Montenegro.

Semifinals

For third place

Final

Bracket

External links
Official website

Final Four
2015–16 in Serbian basketball
2015–16 in Montenegrin basketball
2015–16 in Croatian basketball